Domestic violence and abuse in the United Kingdom are a range of abusive behaviours that occur within relationships. Domestic violence or abuse can be physical, psychological, sexual, financial or emotional. In UK laws and legislation, the term "domestic abuse" is commonly used to encompass various forms of domestic violence. Some specific forms of domestic violence and abuse are criminal offences. Victims or those at risk of domestic abuse can also be provided with remedies and protection via civil law.

This is in consistent with the Istanbul Convention, whose member countries must provide protection orders to victims of domestic abuse to ratify this treaty.

Statutary definition 
The Domestic Abuse Act 2021 creates a statutory definition of domestic abuse, but there are no offences related to this definition. Rather preexisting offences make certain forms of domestic abuse illegal.

This definition states that behaviour is abusive if it involves "physical or sexual abuse; violent or threatening behaviour; controlling or coercive behaviour; economic abuse; or, psychological, emotional or other abuse." In order for such behaviour to be classed as domestic abuse, it must occur between two people who are over the age of 16 and "personally connected" to each other.

Relationships which constitute as "personally connected" are if the two parties are, or have been:
 married or civil partners to each other;
 engaged;
 in an intimate person relationship with each other;
 in a parental relationship with the same child;
 relatives.

Helplines 
The are helplines available for women experiencing domestic abuse such as The National Domestic Abuse Helpline. The National Domestic Abuse Helpline (telephone number 0808-2000-247) from Refuge gives support, help and information about domestic violence. This helpline is confidential, free and available 24 hours per day.

The ManKind Initiative provides a hotline for men experiencing domestic abuse. The hotline Galop provides services for those LGBT relationships who experience abuse.

Domestic abuse shelters 
There are charities that provide temporary accommodation sometimes with associated therapeutic services for those escaping domestic abuse.

Government plans to cut funding for women's refuges could make it harder for women and children to escape domestic violence.  2,000 women a year could be affected.  60% of referrals to refuges were turned away in 2016-17 and funding cuts could make the situation worse. Other vulnerable groups will have to compete for funding with refuges against domestic violence and women fleeing domestic violence may be subject to a postcode lottery over whether they can escape or not.  Women fleeing domestic violence are frequently put into unsuitable housing, such as housing where a toilet leaks and housing overrun with mice. This creates a risk that women will return to the abuser. Other vulnerable women fleeing domestic abuse are forced to sleep rough. Male victims of domestic violence also face challenges when seeking refuge as there are only 19 shelters in the whole of the U.K. offering refuge to men - 78 places in total (of which just 20 places are available for the exclusive use of men). By contrast, there are over 500 shelters for women. 

65% of Local Authorities have cut real terms funding for women's refuges in England, Wales and Scotland since 2010. Those same local authorities have never funded refuges for men and are now even less likely to do so going forward. The government plans to make victims of domestic abuse compete with other vulnerable groups for funding for temporary housing.  People fleeing domestic violence will not be eligible for housing benefit; instead there will be limited funding to provide for domestic violence victims, drug addicts, former offenders and homeless people.

Civil remedies 

The Domestic Abuse Act 2021 has created a single domestic abuse protection order to unify, though not necessarily replace, the current civil law protection orders such as non-molestation orders. Although this Act has passed, currently the new domestic abuse protection orders that have been created have not come into force.

Criminalization 
There are no laws specifically against domestic abuse, but a number of other laws make certain specific forms of domestic abuse illegal such as those involving assault, harassment, or sexual abuse.

Legal aid 
Legal aid is provided for parents who want a court to prevent another parent seeing their child or obtain a divorse through the Family Courts if they have experienced certain forms of domestic abuse. A number of preexisting crimes are considered domestic abuse.

Perpetrators 

Some men have repeatedly killed female partners. In the case of Theodore Johnson, convicted of murder in January 2018 and eventually jailed for a minimum of 30 years, he was found guilty of manslaughter on two previous occasions because of his mental health. Such cases are seen as evidence that violence by men against women is not treated seriously by the authorities.

History 

The history of domestic abuse examines the shift from domestic abuse being socially acceptable to unacceptable and how the law has evolved with that social evolution.

In 1510, Anthony Fitzherbert, a judge, published a manual for legal procedure called The New Natura Brevium. This manual described the writ of supplicavit which was available to wives whose husbands threatened to beat or kill them and allowed the court to punish a husband in these situations. However, the writ had an exception for threats required for the lawful "sake of Government and Chastisement" of a wife. The extent of this exception is unclear. This right to beat was challenged but affirmed in Thomas Seymore Case with Edward Coke issuing a dissenting opinion denying any right of a husband to beat his wife.

The Rule of Thumb was introduced which prohibited a husband beating his wife with a rod thicker than his thumb. Although this provided women protection from excessive beating, it also kept the abuse hidden.

The Lord Leigh case of 1674, ruled that wife beating had not been intended as permissible in the New Natura Brevium but only allowed for admonition and confinement to the house. Wife-beating was increasingly frowned upon in the 17th century which Doggett argued in part stemmed from the Protestant conception of Marriage. Puritans conceptualized marriage as analogous to the relationship between Christ and the Church, viewing the husband as dominant but imposing standards. The clergy and moralists advised husbands against wife-beating. However, many legal writers ignored the Leigh ruling stating that wife beating was a husband's right.

In 1782, the rule of thumb was satirised as an 'ancient doctrine' when Judge Francis Buller was reported as trying to review the principle, with Buller being depicted as 'Judge Thumb'. In 1895 when domestic abuse was restricted to only be permitted during the day, between the hours of 7:00 am to 10:00 pm, due to the noise of wife-beating leading to too many complaints in London.

In 1971, following marches as part of the Reclaim the Night movement, the world's first refuge for domestic violence victims opened. The refuge was established by Erin Pizzey at Belmont Terrace in Chiswick, London. It has since been rebranded as the charity Refuge (United Kingdom charity). Pizzey's pioneering work was widely praised. In 1973 Jack Ashley stated in the House of Commons that "The work of Mrs. Pizzey was pioneering work of the first order. It was she who first identified the problem, who first recognised the seriousness of the situation and who first did something practical by establishing the Chiswick aid centre. As a result of that magnificent pioneering work, the whole nation has now come to appreciate the significance of the problem". Ashley was the first to use the term 'domestic violence' in its modern sense - meaning violence in the home. The term previously referred primarily to civil unrest, violence from within a country as opposed to violence perpetrated by a foreign power. The public pressure that surmounted from these protests for women's rights caused the UK to produce its first piece of legislation tackling domestic violence: the Domestic Violence and Matrimonial Proceedings Act 1976 which created civil protection orders for victims.

Statistics 

 Between one in three and one in four women will likely report to having been affected by domestic abuse during their lifetime.
 Between one in six and one in seven men will report to having been affected by domestic abuse during their lifetime.  
 In cases of alleged domestic abuse in England and Wales, 84.3% of accusations are for non-physical abuse, 12.9% of accusations are for sexual abuse, and 20% of accusations are for stalking.
 The majority of people claiming to have been domestically abused are women.
 The majority of people accused of domestic abuse are men. 
 50% of domestic violence between heterosexual partners is reciprocal or bi-directional: meaning that both the man and the woman are violent.
 50% of domestic violence between heterosexual partners is uni-directional: meaning one partner is violent, and that the other partner does not reciprocate. Women are the perpetrators in 70% of cases of uni-directional domestic violence. These numbers are not accounted for by claims of 'self-defence'. Women retaliate with violence more often than men, but they also initiate violence more often than men. 
 According to the Office of National Statistics (ONS) about 3.0% of men and 6.9% of women suffered domestic abuse in England and Wales during 2022.  This equates to about 699,000 male and 1,700,000 female victims.
 Previous statistics have shown that on average 2 women are murdered every week and 30 men are murdered every year due to domestic violence.  16% of violent crime is domestic abuse though domestic abuse is least likely to be reported to the police. There are more repeat victims of domestic abuse than repeat victims of any other crime. On average domestic abuse victims will have been assaulted 68 times before reporting it to the police.  Domestic abuse is the single most quoted reason a person becomes homeless. Nearly 87% of homeless people are men.  The lack of domestic abuse shelters for men may be a factor in this 
 Age UK provided figures showing 200,000 people aged 60 to 74 experienced domestic abuse in England and Wales during one year, but unrecorded abuse could mean the actual figures are higher. People over 74 were not included in the figures. Caroline Abrahams of Age UK said, "There’s a widespread misconception that domestic abuse only happens to younger people but sadly hundreds of thousands of older people are affected, too.  barriers [to asking for help or to leaving an abusive relationship] can be severe for survivors who have been subject to years of prolonged abuse, are isolated within a particular community through language or culture, are experiencing long-term health impacts or disabilities, or those who are reliant on their abuser for their care or money."
 In 2017 it was reported that the Office for National Statistics's research findings suggested that over 10% of 16-19-year-old women are affected by the issue each year.
 Until March 2020, the Crime Survey for England and Wales showed that an estimated 2.3 million adults aged 16 to 74 years experienced domestic abuse in the last year (1.6 million women and 757,000 men). For statistics on the referrals of suspects of domestic abuse-flagged cases from the police to the Crown Prosecution Service (CPS) for a charging decision fell 19% to 79,965, from 98,470 in the year ending March 2019. Over three-quarters of domestic abuse-related, CPS prosecutions were successful in securing a conviction (78%), a similar level to 2019.

Effects of COVID-19 
During the coronavirus pandemic in 2020, there was generally an increase in demand for domestic abuse victim support services, including a 65% increase in calls and contacts logged by the National Domestic Abuse Helpline between April and June 2020, compared with the first three months of the year. According to the Crime Survey for England and Wales (CSEW) year ending March 2020, an estimated 5.5% of adults aged 16 to 74 years (2.3 million people) experienced domestic abuse in 2019. The police also recorded a total of 1,288,018 domestic abuse-related incidents and crimes in England and Wales (excluding Greater Manchester Police) in the year ending March 2020. Of these cases, 41% (529,077) were incidents not subsequently recorded as a crime. The remaining 59% (758,941) were recorded as domestic abuse-related crimes. Increases in demand for domestic abuse support were particularly noticeable following the easing of lockdown measures in mid-May, such as a 12% increase in the number of domestic abuse cases handled by Victim Support in the week lockdown restrictions were eased. However, as the offences rate flagged as domestic abuse-related has been gradually increasing in recent years, and therefore it is not possible to determine if the coronavirus (COVID-19) pandemic have attributed to the increases in 2020. Domestic abuse campaigner, Jess Phillips MP, maintains the government focused too much on criminal justice, while police resources were cut and the availability of refuge beds was reduced.

Family court 

Changes to legal aid meant, in the first 9 months of 2017, 3234 people claiming to have been abused had to self-represent and appear in court with the people they claimed had abused them. This contrasted with 1309 such people in the first 9 months of 2012. Katie Ghose of Women’s Aid said, "We know that the cross-examination of victims [sic] in the family courts by their abusive former partner [sic] is far too common. (...) It is a matter of urgency that the government prioritises the implementation of the ban on this abhorrent practice, be it through the courts bill or the domestic violence and abuse bill. Survivors must be able to safely access justice in both the criminal and family courts in their escape from domestic abuse."

Applicants' assets are taken into account when deciding if they qualify for Legal Aid. Some applicants are unable to fully access their assets because those assets are controlled by their former partner. This can hamper attempts to secure legal representation in court. Mark Groves of the National Centre for Domestic Violence said, "While many people think Legal Aid is free, it is not. You have to pay a means-tested contribution. Economic abuse victims who don't control their money may not have this [and] those who have fled the family home may not have the right documentation. If you own a house, you have to put down a cash deposit equal to the equity in that house, which could be hundreds of thousands."

Sometimes people accused of domestic violence are able to intimidate their former partner into not appearing in court, resulting in cases being dropped. A report by Police and Northumbria Crime Commissioner, Dame Vera Baird QC, monitored over 220 cases. It suggested that cases where the complainant failed to appear can too easily be dismissed, and that criminal justice services need more resources.

Marginalized groups 
Immigrants are especially vulnerable to domestic violence. Since 2012 under the hostile environment policy immigrants who are victims of domestic abuse are increasingly deported. The Guardian wrote, "The refusal rate for applications under the domestic violence rule rose from 12% in 2012 to 30% in 2016, the last year for which full-year data was available. The figures show that 1,325 people were refused out of a total of 5,820 applications made between 2012 and 2016."  Abuse victims may be deported based on what the abuser states without their case being heard.

In Scotland there is an initiative to reduce domestic violence called the Equally Safe Strategy.  This involves early intervention in domestic abuse cases affecting women, girls and children.  The Caledonian Programme dealing with men convicted of crimes involving domestic abuse will be expanded to help reduce re-offending and the Rape Crisis Sexual Violence Prevention Programme will also be introduced in more schools.  A rape and sexual abuse support service in England and Wales is also receiving a boost.

Most refuges do not have disabled access though disabled women are more likely to experience domestic abuse than able bodied women. One in ten refuge places is accessible to domestic violence victims with physical disabilities.  Out of 131 councils 20 had no accessible places at all.  16.8% of women with chronic sickness or disability suffer domestic abuse compared to 6.3% of able bodied women. Domestic abuse can involve physical, sexual or emotional abuse, as well as not providing care from people with long lasting sickness or disability. Data collected from 144 out of 210 UK councils contacted shows that Council funding for women's refuges overall fell by 6% over the five years to 2018. The largest reduction in spending on domestic violence refuges was from Southampton City Council, which cut spending by 65% since 2013/4.

Women charities in the UK have complained of domestic violence victims being subjected to racism, by being refused places for refuge on the basis of the language they speak. Victims were said to be refused for not speaking English. The charities reported that out of the 20 victims, 5 were rejected by refuges for not speaking the English language.

Notes

References

External links
 National Domestic Abuse Helpline

United Kingdom
Violence in the United Kingdom
Women's rights in the United Kingdom
Family in the United Kingdom